Robert Marico Pifferini, Jr. (born June 27, 1950) is a former professional American football player who played linebacker for four seasons for the Chicago Bears, where he was a sixth-round draft pick,  and one season for the Los Angeles Rams in the 1970s.   He played college football at UCLA.

He is the son of Bob Pifferini, Sr.

References

1950 births
Living people
Players of American football from San Jose, California
American football linebackers
UCLA Bruins football players
Chicago Bears players
Los Angeles Rams players